Nicolas Lemaître (born 12 January 1997) is a French professional footballer who plays as a goalkeeper for Ligue 2 club Quevilly-Rouen.

Career
Lemaître made his debut at the professional level for Reims in a 1–0 Ligue 2 loss to FC Sochaux-Montbéliard on 11 February 2017. Lemaître signed his first professional contract with Reims in June 2017.

Lemaître helped Stade de Reims win the 2017–18 Ligue 2, helping promote them to the Ligue 1 for the 2018–19 season.

In June 2020, Lemaître joined Quevilly-Rouen on a season-long loan. On 1 July 2021, the move was made permanent, and he signed a contract until 2023.

Honours
Reims
 Ligue 2: 2017–18

References

External links
 
 LFP Profile
 Stade de Reims Profile

1997 births
Living people
Sportspeople from Reims
Association football goalkeepers
French footballers
Stade de Reims players
US Quevilly-Rouen Métropole players
Ligue 2 players
Championnat National players
Footballers from Grand Est